Canad Inns is a chain of hotels headquartered in Winnipeg, Manitoba, Canada.

Company overview
Canad Inns operates a total of 12 hotel properties in the province of Manitoba and one in the U.S. state of North Dakota. Canad Inns also operates restaurants, pubs, night clubs, water parks, and first class banquet and conference facilities within its hotel complexes, which are branded as "destination centres."

Several of Canad Inns destination centres are located adjacent to larger venues. Canad Inns Brandon is located adjacent to the Keystone Centre, while the Grand Forks, North Dakota location is connected to the Alerus Center. Canad Inns has locations next to both Club Regent and McPhillips Street Station Casinos in Winnipeg. Their newest location is next to Winnipeg's Health Sciences Centre, the city's largest hospital.

The company also owns the historic Metropolitan Theatre building in downtown Winnipeg and has converted it into a multi-purpose entertainment and banquet facility.

The chain employs more than 3,500 people and is the 14th largest hotel chain in Canada and the largest in Manitoba.

In 2000, Canad Inns was named one of "Canada's 50 Best Managed Companies." In 2009 and 2010, Canad Inns was named one of Manitoba's Top 25 Employers as published by the Winnipeg Free Press.

Sponsorships
In 2001, the company purchased the naming rights to Winnipeg Stadium, home of the Winnipeg Blue Bombers of the Canadian Football League, after which the stadium became known as Canad Inns Stadium. The stadium was demolished in 2013.

Litigation
In 2007, Lake Louise Limited Partnership filed suit alleging that Canad inflated management fees owed to it for operating Club Regent Casino Hotel and Canad Inns Brandon by including every dollar deposited in video lottery terminals (VLTs) as gross revenue.

In November 2014, the receiver for the failed Crocus Fund petitioned a court to dissolve and liquidate the parent company of Canad Inns, alleging Canad Corporation assets to have been wrongfully diverted for company president Leo Ledohowski's benefit.

In December 2014, Antonio Ventresca and his wife, both former employees, sued Canad Corporation for wrongful dismissal; the suit also claims that Mr. (Leo) Ledohowski sexually harassed Mrs. Ventresca while the pair were working for the hotel.

 these suits remain before the court and no final rulings have been issued.

In June 2021, a new Statement of Claim (& comprehensive lawsuit) was
commenced that also includes the Winnipeg Law Firm, Fillmore Riley LLP by Former Director, Co-founder & Working Partner Ron Ledohowski (brother of Leo) on behalf of Ledohowski Holdings Ltd. et al

Hotel properties

Winnipeg, Manitoba
Club Regent Casino (Hotel)
Polo Park
Windsor Park
Transcona
Garden City
Fort Garry
Express Fort Garry (Sold in 2018)
Radisson Winnipeg (downtown location)
Health Sciences Centre (Hotel)
Portage la Prairie, Manitoba
Brandon, Manitoba
Keystone Centre (Hotel)
Grand Forks, North Dakota
Alerus Center (Hotel)

Brands
Food and Beverage 
Aalto's Garden Cafe
Tavern United
Hacienda Patio
l' Bistro
Garbonzo's Pizza
Garbonzo's Pizza & Arcade
Garbonzo's Pizza Pub
12 resto bar
2 Starbucks locations
Entertainment
Splasher's Indoor Water Park
Playmaker's Gaming Lounge
The Metropolitan Entertainment Centre
Celebration's Dinner Theatre (WOW Hospitality Concept)
Nightclubs 
Essence Event Center
Nashville's 
Cowboys
Tijuana Yacht Club Event Center
Reign Nightclub (closed/demolished in 2018)
The Great Western Roadhouse
Ambassador Banquet & Conference Centre

References

External links
Canad Inns website
Canad Clubs
Crocus Update: ~34,000 Manitobans essentially get "ripped off & beaten"
Ron Ledohowski
Further Historical News, quotes, articles & upcoming book

Hotel and leisure companies of Canada
Companies based in Winnipeg
Hotel chains in Canada